The International Children's Art Archive, popularly known as PapaInk, served as the archival home of children's art between 1999–2006. Prior to its closing, the non-profit organization's archival website documented and exhibited children's art collections from its own physical holdings as well as presenting works donated or shared by organizations and individuals worldwide. The result was to bring to public view collections that would otherwise remain largely unseen, and to bring together widely dispersed works of children's art in a single, dedicated context.

PapaInk made available an international sampling of historical children's art, works by contemporary children and the childhood work of professional artists. Selected holdings, from important partnerships the organization formed, such as the Jewish Museum in Prague's WWII era Terezín collection and the Christian Children's Fund collection spanning 60 years, provided works of established historical value a long-term broad-based public exposure for the first time through presentation on the organization's online archive. Other holdings, such as works contributed by nonprofits, businesses, professional artists, educators and young artists themselves, were brought within the purview of historical and contemporary appreciation by virtue of The PapaInk's exhibition and preservation efforts.

The depth and breadth of the organization's holdings gave rise to an often noted unique and surprisingly profound experience of children's art which attracted the attention of important arbiters of culture and art such as the New York Times and Art in America. During its years of operation, PapaInk attracted in excess of 12 million visitors to digital archive.

In addition to its collection of children's art, PapaInk's online magazine dedicated to parenting included an eclectic blend of interviews conducted by the organization's founder Marc Feldman. PapaInk!'s published interviews were part of its "iPapa Project"

Beyond engaging the public as viewers and appreciators of children's works, PapaInk provided a venue for young artists, their families and communities to exhibit and preserve their art. The organization also worked with businesses, nonprofits and libraries to sponsor children's art collections that were displayed and archived on PapaInk. Central to PapaInk's collection development activities was the efforts of a worldwide network of volunteers who contributed personal and institutional collections, and gathered children's art from their local communities for archival exhibition on PapaInk. PapaInk provided its archival, display, marketing and PR services at no-cost.

References

Art websites